Sankarist Democratic Front (in French: Front Démocratique Sankariste, FDS) is a Sankarist political party in Burkina Faso.
It was founded in June 2004 as split from the Sankarist Pan-African Convention. It is led by Fidèle Meng-Néré Kientéga and Inoussa Kaboré.

Political parties in Burkina Faso
Sankarist political parties in Burkina Faso